Jalmenus eubulus (common name Pale imperial hairstreak) is a butterfly of the family Lycaenidae. It is found in the Australian states of New South Wales and Queensland, in the Murray-Darling basin.  It was first described in 1876 by William Henry Miskin.

It was formerly considered to be a subspecies of Jalmenus evagoras (Jalmenus evagoras eubulus Miskin, 1876)

In 2021, it was considered likely to be extinct by 2040 with a 42% probability.
It is considered a vulnerable species in Queensland, and a critically threatened species in New South Wales.

Description
Miskin's original description:Upperside: pearly white, with slightly opalescent hues. Primaries: With costa, apex and outer margin widely dark brown; small black transverse line at termination of cell. Secondaries: with the veins brown; outer margin narrowly bordered with brown, gradually decreasing to apex; a submarginal line of white from apical to anal angle; second and third median branches terminating in well developed tails; the first median and submedian forming points but not extended; between the two tails a large crescent of orange surmounting black border, and in the angle a patch of orange; between the orange patches black crowned with white, and above all a faint margin of brown. 

Underside: greyish-white. Primaries: with outer edge of Aving dark brown; a marginal band of pale brown or fawn colour; an inner line of faint brown; a transverse interrupted streak of dark brown; three short discal streaks within cell. Secondaries: With edge, band, and transverse streak, as in primaries, the latter being elbowed twice, opposite the tails; a dark speck near base; a short dark streak in cell, one near costa, a longer one at termination of cell; orange spots as on upper side, but rather larger.

Thorax and abdomen: upperside dark grey; underside light grey.

References

External links
Jalmenus eubulus: Images and occurrence data from GBIF

Theclinae
Insects described in 1876